Beta 2 (β2), may stand for:

Beta-2 adrenergic receptor
Beta 2 Limited
NeuroD1, transcription factor
TGF beta 2